Oxelösund Municipality held a municipal election on 14 September 2014 as part of the local elections. This was held on the same day as the general election.

Results
The number of seats remained at 31 with the Social Democrats winning the most at 13, a gain of one from 2010. There were 7,624 valid ballots cast.

Electoral wards
All electoral wards were located in the Oxelösund urban area in a single constituency.

References

Oxelösund
Oxelösund municipal elections